Areniscythris brachypteris, the Oso Flaco flightless moth or sand-dune grasshopper moth, is a moth of the family Scythrididae. It was described by Jerry A. Powell in 1976. It is found in the coastal sand dunes of California.

The species is diurnal and flightless due to its reduced wings. Adults move by running on open sand and by leaping, enabling passive dispersal by wind. The adults dig shallow pits in which they crouch during daytime windy periods and in which they bury themselves each night.

The larvae are very elongate and thin. They live in sand-covered silken tubes attached to buried, green parts of various plants growing at the margin of the sand dunes.

References

Scythrididae
Moths described in 1976
Moths of North America